Phoebe chekiangensis is a species of tree up to  in the family Lauraceae. It is endemic to China where it occurs in Fujian, Jiangxi, and Zhejiang provinces. Its name refers to Zhejiang province that is written "Chekiang" in Wade–Giles romanization. It is threatened by habitat loss. It is under second-class national protection in China.

References

Endemic flora of China
Trees of China
chekiangensis
Vulnerable plants
Taxonomy articles created by Polbot